James Russell Kendrick (born August 2, 1961) is the fourth and current bishop of the Episcopal Diocese of the Central Gulf Coast.

Biography 
Kendrick was born on August 2, 1961 in Fort Walton Beach, Florida. He graduated with a Bachelor of Arts in architecture and marketing from Auburn University in 1984. He later studied at the Virginia Theological Seminary from there, graduated with a Master of Divinity in 1995. He was ordained deacon in 1995 and priest in 1996. He then became assistant to the rector of the Church of the Nativity in Dothan, Alabama. In 2007 he became rector of St. Stephen's Church in Vestavia Hills, Alabama.

Kendrick was elected on the third ballot as the fourth bishop of the Central Gulf Coast on February 21, 2015, during the 44th annual convention of the diocese held at Trinity Church in Mobile, Alabama. He was consecrated on July 25, 2015 by Presiding Bishop Katharine Jefferts Schori.

See also
 List of Episcopal bishops of the United States
 Historical list of the Episcopal bishops of the United States

References

External links
Russell Kendrick consecrated bishop of the Central Gulf Coast
The Bishop-Elect of the Diocese of the Central Gulf Coast

1961 births
Living people
People from Fort Walton Beach, Florida
Virginia Theological Seminary alumni
Auburn University alumni
21st-century Anglican bishops in the United States
Episcopal bishops of the Central Gulf Coast